Campeonato Entrerriano de hockey sobre patines (Entre Rios Roller Hockey Championship) is the state Roller Hockey Clubs Championship in Entre Rios, Argentina.

List of winners

Number of Argentine championships by team

External links

Argentina websites
Liga Nacional Official Website
Cofederation Argentina de Patin
Hockey Parana
Bochin Stick

International
 Roller Hockey links worldwide
 Mundook-World Roller Hockey
rink-hockey-news - World Roller Hockey

Roller hockey in Argentina
Roller hockey competitions in Argentina